A Scattered Life is a 2010 novel written by American author Karen McQuestion and published by AmazonEncore a division of Amazon Publishing. Originally released solely as an e-book for Amazon's Kindle, the novel is notable for being the first self-published Kindle book optioned for film. Producer Eric Lake optioned the rights for the L.A.-based production company, Hiding In Bed, in November 2009.

Set in small-town Wisconsin and told with humor and pathos, A Scattered Life is the story of a friendship triangle between a young wife, her intrusive mother-in-law, and a baby-obsessed mother of five.

Plot summary

From the publisher: Free-spirit Skyla Plinka has found the love and stability she always wanted in her reliable husband Thomas. Settling into her new family and roles as wife and mother, life in rural Wisconsin is satisfying, but can’t seem to quell Skyla’s growing sense of restlessness. Her only reprieve is her growing friendship with neighbor Roxanne, who has five kids (and counting) and a life in constant disarray – but also a life filled with laughter and love.

Much to the dismay of her intrusive mother-in-law, Audrey, Skyla takes a part-time job at the local bookstore and slowly begins to rediscover her voice, independence and confidence. Throughout one pivotal year in the life of Skyla, Audrey and Roxanne, all three very different women will learn what it means to love unconditionally. With the storytelling ingenuity of Anne Tyler, the writing talent of Jodi Picoult, and the subtlety of Alice Munro, McQuestion offers a satisfying debut that proves she is a gifted portraitist, a natural storyteller and an author to watch.

See also

Option (filmmaking)
Self-publishing
Amazon Kindle

References

Kindle Bestselling Author, Karen McQuestion, on Her Movie Deal

External links
Karen McQuestion Official Website
 Interview with Karen McQuestion on A Newbie's Guide to Publishing
A Scattered Life (2010)

2010 American novels
Novels set in Wisconsin
2010 debut novels